Dimitrios Douros (born June 3, 1980, in United States) is a former Olympic baseball player. He participated in the 2004 Summer Olympics, as a member of the Greece national baseball team.

External links

Greek baseball players
Baseball players at the 2004 Summer Olympics
Olympic baseball players of Greece
Living people
1980 births
Place of birth missing (living people)
American people of Greek descent
21st-century American people